Sclater's mouse shrew (Myosorex sclateri) is a species of mammal in the family Soricidae endemic to South Africa. Its natural habitats are subtropical or tropical moist lowland forests and swamps.

References

Endemic fauna of South Africa
Myosorex
Mammals of South Africa
Taxonomy articles created by Polbot
Mammals described in 1905
Taxa named by Oldfield Thomas